Aleksandar Višnjić (Александар Вишњић) (born 20 March 1976) is a Serbian politician. He is the leader of Reformist Party which took part as an independent list in 2007 Serbian parliamentary election and 2008 but won no seats. He was a member of the Democratic Party (Demoktratska Stranka), but left in 2004/5.

References
Reformist Party website

1976 births
Living people
Democratic Party (Serbia) politicians
Reformist Party (Serbia) politicians